Interstate 78 (I-78) is an east–west Interstate Highway in the Northeastern United States, running  from I-81 northeast of Harrisburg, Pennsylvania, through Allentown to western and northern New Jersey and terminating at the Holland Tunnel entrance to Lower Manhattan in New York City.

I-78 links ports in New York City and North Jersey to points west, including the Lehigh Valley, the third largest metropolitan region of Pennsylvania. I-78 accommodates over four million trucks annually, representing 24 percent of all truck traffic in the nation. It also is a major connection point to Newark Liberty International Airport, John F. Kennedy International Airport, and LaGuardia Airport, the New York metropolitan area's three major international airports.

Route description

|-
|PA
|
|-
|NJ
|
|-
||NY
|
|-
|Total
|
|}

Pennsylvania

Near the east end of the county, at exit 8, U.S. Route 22 (US 22) merges with I-78, running concurrently for the next  through Berks and Lehigh counties.

At exit 51, in Upper Macungie Township, US 22 leaves the highway. Drivers on I-78 eastbound must use this exit to access I-476 (Northeast Extension of the Pennsylvania Turnpike), and westbound travelers must use exit 53 (northbound Pennsylvania Route 309, PA 309) and then westbound US 22. From exits 53 to 60, I-78 runs concurrently with PA 309. The six-lane overlap bypasses the city of Allentown to the south and crosses South Mountain.

At exit 60 (A–B going westbound), PA 309 yields south to Quakertown. At exit 71, PA 33 reaches its southern terminus at a trumpet interchange. PA 33 traverses the Pocono Mountains as it enters Bangor and crosses I-80. The final exit on I-78 in Pennsylvania is Morgan Hill Road, providing access to PA 611 and Easton. I-78 then crosses the I-78 Toll Bridge and enters the state of New Jersey.

New Jersey

After the I-78 Toll Bridge, I-78 enters New Jersey as the Phillipsburg–Newark Expressway. The road begins by running parallel with County Route 642 (CR 642) in the town of Alpha. At , a partial cloverleaf interchange brings together US 22, Route 122, and Route 173 with I-78 in Phillipsburg. US 22 now runs concurrently with I-78 for the next . Going westbound, exit 4 leaves to the right for CR 637 and Warren Glen. The next exit, exit 6, is for CR 632 in Bloomsbury. However, the route number is not signed on I-78. Exit 7 is the first of several eastbound exits for Route 173. This one is located in Bloomsbury as Route 173 begins to parallel the Interstate.  later, exit 11 leaves to the right as another exit for Route 173. CR 614 also is located off the exit. Exit 12 westbound is for Route 173 again. However, exit 12 eastbound is for a frontage road parallelling I-78.

Exit 13 is only westbound and is another exit for Route 173. Nearby the exit, going eastbound, the frontage road merges in. Exit 15 is for Route 173 and CR 513 in Franklin Township. Exit 17 is for Route 31 in Clinton Township. In the town of Annandale, US 22 leaves I-78 at exit 18. US 22 continues toward Bound Brook and Union County. At exit 20, CR 639 intersects. CR 639 heads toward the Round Valley Reservoir. Exit 24 is for CR 523 toward Oldwick. At exit 29, I-287, US 202, and US 206 interchange with I-78 in Bedminster. At this point, in Somerset County, exits 33, 36, and 40 are for county routes in Warren Township. At exit 41, I-78 enters Union County and then passes through the Watchung Reservation, where land bridges cross over the highway to allow wildlife to transit safely. At exit 45, CR 527 intersects after paralleling for some time. West of exit 48, I-78 splits into express and local highways. Exit 48 is for Route 24 in Springfield Township. Exit 49A is for one of Route 24's spur routes, Route 124. Exit 52 is for the Garden State Parkway in Union Township. At exits 57 and 58, Route 21, US 1, US 9, and US 22 intersect I-78. The exit provides access to Newark Liberty International Airport.

East of exit 58 at the eastern tip of Newark, I-78 becomes the Newark Bay Extension of the New Jersey Turnpike. Past the first toll plaza, I-78 has an interchange with I-95 (New Jersey Turnpike) and crosses Newark Bay via the Newark Bay Bridge. The first exit, 14A, is for Route 440 in Bayonne. The Liberty State Park can be reached by taking exit 14B. Exit 14C is the final numbered exit, providing access to the Liberty Science Center. Route 139 runs concurrently with I-78 as it approaches the Holland Tunnel and enters New York.

New York

I-78's length in New York is only —half of the Holland Tunnel and the egress-only roundabout immediately beyond the end of the tunnel. The route was planned to run east and north through New York City to end at I-95 in the Bronx, but sections of the planned route, including the Lower Manhattan Expressway, were canceled.

In New York City, I-78 continues through the limited-access egress-only roundabout known as the Saint John's Rotary. The five separate exits from the Rotary are assigned numbers—exits 1 to 5—in counterclockwise order. The last one—and the logical continuation east—is exit 5, Canal Street. Under the original plans, I-78 was to continue across Manhattan as the Lower Manhattan Expressway onto the Williamsburg Bridge and then beyond I-278 on the never-built Bushwick Expressway through Brooklyn into Queens near the John F. Kennedy International Airport. A section of I-78 at the airport was built as the Nassau Expressway, later I-878 and now New York State Route 878 (NY 878), though most of the westbound side was never built. East of the airport, I-78 would have turned north on the Clearview Expressway (built north of Hillside Avenue in Queens and now I-295), run across the Throgs Neck Bridge, and forked into two spurs, ending at I-95 via the Throgs Neck Expressway (now I-695) and the Bruckner Interchange via the Cross Bronx Expressway (now part of I-295).

Junction list

Pennsylvania
  west-northwest of Jonestown
  east-northeast of Fredericksburg. The highways travel concurrently to east-northeast of Fogelsville.
  west of Allentown
  southwest of Easton
New Jersey
  east-northeast of Alpha. The highways travel concurrently to Annandale.
  in Bedminster
  in Springfield
  in Union Township
  in Newark
  in Newark
New York
 Canal Street in Lower Manhattan

Auxiliary routes
All of I-78's auxiliary routes serve New York City; however, none of these routes actually intersect I-78, following the route's truncation at the eastern end of the Holland Tunnel.
 runs from US 1/9 in Linden, New Jersey, over the Goethals Bridge, through Staten Island, over the Verrazzano-Narrows Bridge and through Brooklyn and Queens, and across the Triborough Bridge into the Bronx to end at I-95 at the Bruckner Interchange. I-278 was planned to extend west from Elizabeth, New Jersey, to I-78 in Springfield Township, Union County, New Jersey, and was to intersect I-78 at the east end of the Williamsburg Bridge in Brooklyn. Until 1972, I-278 ran along present-NY 895 and a proposed extension to I-95, while I-278 east of NY 895 was I-878.
 is an unsigned designation for the Brooklyn–Battery Tunnel, a spur from I-278 into Lower Manhattan. Plans were made to continue it north along the West Side Highway (NY 9A) to I-78 at the Holland Tunnel, though the project was later canceled.
 runs from I-278 at the Bruckner Interchange south over the Bronx–Whitestone Bridge to John F. Kennedy International Airport. It was to intersect I-78 at its south end. Original plans took I-678 west on the Grand Central Parkway to I-278.
 is an unsigned designation for part of NY 878, a short west–east freeway on the north edge of John F. Kennedy International Airport. It was once planned as part of I-78 and now intersects I-678. The number was assigned in 1970.
A former I-878 existed from 1959 to 1972 along present I-278 east of NY 895. (NY 895 was part of I-278.)

In eastern Pennsylvania, PA 378, which exits into downtown Bethlehem was once I-378 but was redesignated as a state route after I-78 was rerouted to a new southerly alignment. I-178 was initially planned as an extension into Center City, Allentown, but was canceled due to local opposition.

References

External links

 
78